The 2022 Torneig Internacional Els Gorchs was a professional tennis tournament played on outdoor hard courts. It was the eleventh edition of the tournament which was part of the 2022 ITF Women's World Tennis Tour. It took place in Les Franqueses del Vallès, Spain between 24 and 30 October 2022.

Champions

Singles

  Jasmine Paolini def.  Kateryna Baindl, 6–4, 6–4

Doubles

  Aliona Bolsova /  Rebeka Masarova def.  Misaki Doi /  Beatrice Gumulya, 7–5, 1–6, [10–3]

Singles main draw entrants

Seeds

 1 Rankings are as of 17 October 2022.

Other entrants
The following players received wildcards into the singles main draw:
  Irene Burillo Escorihuela
  Yvonne Cavallé Reimers
  Andrea Lázaro García
  Rosa Vicens Mas

The following player received entry into the singles main draw as a special exempt:
  Rebeka Masarova

The following players received entry from the qualifying draw:
  Marie Benoît
  Francesca Curmi
  Marta González Encinas
  Ksenia Laskutova
  Nika Radišić
  Darja Semenistaja
  Shin Ji-ho
  Natalija Stevanović

References

External links
 2022 Torneig Internacional Els Gorchs at ITFtennis.com
 Official website

2022 ITF Women's World Tennis Tour
2022 in Spanish tennis
October 2022 sports events in Spain